ANCC may stand for:
 All Nations Christian College, a missions college, located in Hertfordshire and validated by the Open University
 American National Catholic Church, an independent Catholic denomination
 American Nurses Credentialing Center, a nursing credentialing organization in the United States